Christopher Yost is a Canadian biologist, currently a Canada Research Chair in Microbes, the Environment and Food Safety at University of Regina.

References

Year of birth missing (living people)
Living people
Academic staff of the University of Regina
Canadian biologists